Brent Thomson (born 1958 in Wanganui) is a New Zealand jockey, who is best known for winning the Cox Plate on four occasions and his association with the champion horse Dulcify.

The son of a leading trainer Kevin Thomson, Brent became the champion apprentice of New Zealand at the age of 16.

He moved to Australia as a fresh-faced teenager to further his career earning the nickname ‘The Babe’ from the local racing press.

Settling in Melbourne, he became the stable rider for Colin Hayes winning three jockey's premierships during his six-year association with the trainer which included wins in these Cox Plate on So Called and the AJC Derby, Victoria Derby, Rosehill Guineas and the Cox Plate on Dulcify. He also won many major races riding for other trainers including the Caulfield Cup on Gurner's Lane.

A successful stint riding overseas (chiefly in the United Kingdom) followed where he rode more than 100 winners. He also rode the Australian horse Strawberry Road to victory in the 1984 Grosser Preis von Baden

Upon returning to Australia, further big race success followed winning a second Caulfield Cup and an Adelaide Cup on Lord Reims as well as a famous victory in the Australian Cup on Dandy Andy who defeated the champions Vo Rogue and Bonecrusher at long odds.

Thomson retired from riding in 2000 but continued to work in the bloodstock industry.

In 2012 he was inducted into the New Zealand Racing Hall of Fame and in 2019 into the Australian Racing Hall of Fame.

See also

 Thoroughbred racing in Australia
 Thoroughbred racing in New Zealand

References 

New Zealand jockeys
Australian Thoroughbred Racing Hall of Fame inductees
People from Whanganui
1958 births
Living people
New Zealand Racing Hall of Fame inductees